State Route 231 (SR 231) is a  state highway located in Cumberland County in southeastern Maine.  It begins at State Route 115 in North Yarmouth and runs north to New Gloucester, where it ends at U.S. Route 202, State Route 4 and State Route 100.  The highway functions as an eastern bypass of Gray.

Route description 
SR 231 begins at SR 115 in North Yarmouth, where SR 115 turns northwest on Gray Road towards downtown Gray.  SR 231 proceeds north thRough the town center and crosses the Royal River.  The highway nicks the eastern corner of Gray and crosses into the town of New Gloucester, where it continues north through the town center and terminates at Lewiston Road, which carries US 202 / SR 4 / SR 100.

SR 231 is called New Gloucester Road in North Yarmouth and Intervale Road in New Gloucester.

Major junctions

See also

References

External links

Floodgap Roadgap's RoadsAroundME: Maine State Route 231

231
Transportation in Cumberland County, Maine